Audio compression may refer to:

Audio compression (data), a type of lossy or lossless compression in which the amount of data in a recorded waveform is reduced to differing extents for transmission respectively with or without some loss of quality, used in CD and MP3 encoding, Internet radio, and the like
Dynamic range compression, also called audio level compression, in which the dynamic range, the difference between loud and quiet, of an audio waveform is reduced